Daphniidae is a family of water fleas in the order Anomopoda.

Description
Members of the family Daphniidae differ from other, similar diplostracans, such as the Macrotrichidae and Moinidae, in that the antennae of females are short and immobile.

Ecology
The feeding mechanism of the members of the family Daphniidae differs from that of the Macrotrichidae in allowing the animals to engage in filter feeding, rather than having to scrape food from a surface. They have evolved to fill a number of different ecological niches. Scapholeberis and Megafenestra contain species adapted to living around the surface film; Simocephalus species cling to objects while filter feeding; others have developed a pelagic lifestyle.

Taxonomy
The family Daphniidae contains 121 species in five genera:
Ceriodaphnia Dana, 1853
Daphnia O. F. Müller, 1785
Megafenestra Dumont & Pensaert, 1983
Scapholeberis Schoedler, 1858
Simocephalus Schoedler, 1858

The members of the family Moinidae may also be placed among the Daphniidae.

See also
Daphnia pulex
Ceriodaphnia dubia

References

External links

Cladocera
Crustacean families